Eu Não Faço a Menor Ideia do que eu Tô Fazendo Com a Minha Vida is a 2012 Brazilian comedy-drama film directed by Matheus Souza. The film opened the competitive exhibition at the 40th Gramado Film Festival.

Plot 
The film follows the story of Clara, played by actress Clarice Falcão, which accepts to study medicine by family pressure. Without vocation for the profession, she stops going to the classes while initiates a new parallel life during the morning, with the purpose of discovering, to her own way, what's her talent and what she really wants out of life.

Cast 

Clarice Falcão
Rodrigo Pandolfo
Daniel Filho
Nelson Freitas
Bianca Byington
Leandro Hassum
Augusto Madeira
Gregório Duvivier
Alexandre Nero
Priscila Razembaum
Camilla Amado
Kiko Mascarenhas
Bel Garcia
Cristiana Peres
Wagner Santisteban
Leandro Soares 
George Sauma

References

2012 comedy-drama films
2012 films
Brazilian comedy-drama films
Films shot in Rio de Janeiro (city)
2010s Portuguese-language films